The list of symphonies in B major includes:

Robert Farnon
Symphony in B "Ottawa" (1943)
Ruth Gipps
Symphony No. 2
Joseph Haydn
Symphony No. 46 (1772)
Jef van Hoof
Symphony No. 4 (1950)
Erich Wolfgang Korngold
 Sinfonietta, Op. 5 (1912)
George Lloyd
Symphony No.4 "Arctic" (1945-6)
Georg Matthias Monn
Sinfonia (1740s)
Dmitri Shostakovich
Symphony No. 2 "To October", Op. 14 (1927)
Leo Sowerby
Symphony No. 2 (1928)
Charles Tournemire
Symphony No. 2

References

See also
List of symphonies by key

B major
Symphonies